Morikawa (most commonly ) is a Japanese surname. Notable people with the surname include:

Aizō Morikawa (1878–1949), photographer
Collin Morikawa (born 1997), American golfer
, Japanese tea master 
, Japanese film director
Miho Morikawa (born 1968), singer and model
, Japanese footballer
Toshiyuki Morikawa (born 1967), voice actor
Yōichirō Morikawa (born 1979), film director, screenwriter and actor
, Japanese racewalker
, Japanese footballer

References 

Japanese-language surnames